Domiyeh (also Romanized as Domīyeh; also known as Dowmeyeh and Dowmīyeh) is a village in Babuyi Rural District, Basht District, Basht County, Kohgiluyeh and Boyer-Ahmad Province, Iran. At the 2006 census, its population was 79, in 14 families.

References 

Populated places in Basht County